The 2013 FIVB Volleyball World League was the 24th edition of the annual men's international volleyball tournament, played by 18 countries from 31 May to 21 July 2013. The Final Round was held in Mar del Plata, Argentina.

Qualification

Top 14 teams of the 2012 edition directly qualified.
 and  qualified through the qualification.
 (dropout from 2012 World League) replaced , who withdrew from the tournament.

Format
It is the first time the World League will feature 18 teams, having had 16 teams from 2001–2003 and 2006–2012. The World League featured eight teams in its inaugural year in 1990, 10 in 1991 and then 12 from 1992–2000 and 2004–05.
The top three world ranked teams in each pool will play three matches at home and two away with the bottom three world ranked teams playing twice at home and three times away.

Pools composition
Pools A and B are determined using the Serpentine system based on the FIVB World Ranking as of 13 August 2012. Pool C features teams ranked as the next best four in the World Ranking after the 12 teams in Pool A and B plus two additional teams, which were confirmed by the FIVB Executive Committee during its end of year meeting on 15 December 2012. The pools were announced on 1 December 2012.

Squads

Pool standing procedure
 Match points
 Number of matches won
 Sets ratio
 Points ratio
 Result of the last match between the tied teams

Match won 3–0 or 3–1: 3 match points for the winner, 0 match points for the loser
Match won 3–2: 2 match points for the winner, 1 match point for the loser

Intercontinental round
All times are local.
The Final Round hosts Argentina, the top two teams from Pool A and B and the winners of Pool C will qualify for the Final Round. If Argentina are one of the top two teams in Pool A, Pool A will send its top three teams.

Pool A

|}

Week 1

|}

Week 2

|}

Week 3

|}

Week 4

|}

Week 5

|}

Week 6

|}

Pool B

|}

Week 1

|}

Week 2

|}

Week 3

|}

Week 4

|}

Week 5

|}

Week 6

|}

Pool C

|}

Week 1

|}

Week 2

|}

Week 3

|}

Week 4

|}

Week 5

|}

Week 6

|}

Final round
Venue:  Polideportivo Islas Malvinas, Mar del Plata, Argentina
All times are Argentina Time (UTC−03:00).

Pool play

Pool D

|}

|}

Pool E

|}

|}

Final four

Semifinals

|}

3rd place match

|}

Final

|}

Final standing

Awards

Most Valuable Player
  Nikolay Pavlov
Best Setter
  Bruno Rezende
Best Outside Spikers
  Ivan Zaytsev
  Ricardo Lucarelli

Best Middle Blockers
  Dmitriy Muserskiy
  Emanuele Birarelli
Best Opposite Spiker
  Tsvetan Sokolov
Best Libero
  Mário Pedreira

References

External links
Official website
Final Standing
Statistics of the Final Round
Statistics of the Intercontinental Round

2013
FIVB World League
International volleyball competitions hosted by Argentina